Ljubinko Đurković is a Serbian politician and retired colonel. He is best known for having led forces of the Yugoslav Army in the Battle of Košare during the 1999 Kosovo War. On 18 October 2022, he received a mandate to serve in the National Assembly of Serbia.

Military career
Đurković graduated from the Military Academy and General Staff School in Belgrade. He was assigned to what was then the Socialist Autonomous Province of Kosovo in 1985, with his home garrison situated in Peć. During the Croatian War of the 1990s, he fought with the forces of the Republika Srpska Krajina in Pakrac.

In the battle of Košare, the Yugoslavian Army fought against insurgents from the Kosovo Liberation Army (KLA), who were aided by the North Atlantic Treaty Organization (NATO) and the Albanian Army. In two months of intense fighting, the Yugoslavian forces prevented the KLA from securing a corridor from Albania into Kosovo. Đurković served at this time as commander of the Second Battalion of the 125th Motorized Brigade. In a 2018 interview, he described the KLA attack as part of a larger campaign of NATO aggression and praised his soldiers for what he described as their bravery in defending their homeland and its cultural heritage under extremely difficult conditions. He also described the battle as having been a "forbidden topic" in the years immediately after the war and expressed gratitude that its military importance was belatedly recognized. In another interview, he praised non-Serb officers in the Yugoslav Army for their service at Košare, giving particular citation to Captain Krunoslav Ivanković, an ethnic Croat who died in the battle.

He retired from the Serbian Armed Forces (a successor body to the Yugoslavian army) in 2011 with the rank of colonel. He now lives in the village of Pocesje in Raška.

Political career
Đurković has served as vice-president of a small political organization called the Movement for Serbia (Pokret za Srbiju).

He appeared on the combined electoral list of the Democratic Party of Serbia (Demokratska stranka Srbije, DSS) and Dveri in the 2016 Serbian parliamentary election as a non-party candidate. During this campaign, he said that he would seek the annulment of all agreements with NATO that harm Serbia's interests and that he would fight for the interests of veterans and those invalided by war. The DSS–Dveri alliance was on the right wing of the political spectrum; this notwithstanding, DSS leader Sanda Rašković Ivić described Đurković as a "committed leftist" who had chosen to align himself with their campaign. He appeared in the twenty-fifth position on their list; the list won thirteen mandates, and he was not elected.

In 2018, Đurković attended a conference entitled "Spiritual and Moral Security of Man in the Modern World" (Духовно-морална безбедност човека у савременом свету) in Luhansk, in the secessionist Luhansk People's Republic in Ukraine. He argued that the spiritual values of the Donbas people would lead them to victory over what he described as the materialist values of the west. He also criticized not only NATO but also the peacekeeping forces of the United Nations for their actions in the Yugoslav Wars of the 1990s.

Đurković received the first position on the For the Kingdom of Serbia electoral list led by the Movement for the Restoration of the Kingdom of Serbia (Pokret obnove Kraljevine Srbije, POKS) in the 2020 Serbian parliamentary election. Once again, he contested the election as a non-party figure. In accepting the nomination, he said that he would fight for Serbia to provide support for soldiers who fought "in the defence of Kosovo and Metohija" and for those whom he described as "patriots" who fought in the Yugoslav Wars. He was later part of a For the Kingdom Serbia delegation that laid a wreath at the monument of Draža Mihailović at Ravna Gora; in so doing, he argued for Mihailović's credentials as an anti-fascist leader. The POKS list narrowly missed the threshold to win representation in the assembly.

In December 2021, the POKS became divided into rival groups led by party founder Žika Gojković and former Belgrade mayor Vojislav Mihailović. Đurković joined Mihailović's group, which contested the 2022 Serbian parliamentary election as part of the National Democratic Alternative (Nacionalno demokratska alternativa, NADA) alliance. Due to an ongoing dispute over the party name, Mihailović's group could not be identified as the POKS; it instead used the name "For the Kingdom of Serbia (Monarchists)." Đurković received the seventeenth position on the alliance's list and narrowly missed election when the list won fifteen mandates. Soon after the vote, Mihailović was recognized by Serbia's government as the legitimate leader of the POKS.

Đurković received a mandate to serve in the assembly on 18 October 2022, as the replacement for another member elected for the "Monarchists."

References

1962 births
Living people
People from Raška, Serbia
Serbian monarchists
Serbian military personnel of the Kosovo War
Serbia and Montenegro military personnel
Members of the National Assembly (Serbia)